Thomas Dene  was an Irishman who was Bishop of Ferns from 1363 to 1400.

Formerly Archdeacon of Ferns, he was consecrated bishop on  18 June 1363. He died on  27 August 1400.

References

Year of birth missing
1400 deaths
14th-century Roman Catholic bishops in Ireland
Bishops of Ferns
Archdeacons of Ferns